A10 class may refer to:

 Queensland A10 Avonside class locomotive
 Queensland A10 Baldwin class locomotive
 Queensland A10 Fairlie class locomotive
 Queensland A10 Ipswich class locomotive
 Queensland A10 Neilson class locomotive